Al Haouz is a province in the Moroccan economic region of Marrakesh-Safi. Its population in 2004 was 484,312.

The major cities and towns are:
 Ait Ourir
 Amizmiz
 Ghmate
 Lalla Takarkoust
 My Brahim
 Sidi Abdallah Ghiat
 Tahannaout
 Tameslouht

Subdivisions
The province is divided administratively into the following:

References

 
Al Haouz Province